The 2020 The Citadel Bulldogs football team represented The Citadel, The Military College of South Carolina in the 2020–21 NCAA Division I FCS football season. The Bulldogs were led by fifth-year head coach Brent Thompson and played their home games at Johnson Hagood Stadium. They competed as members of the Southern Conference (SoCon).

Previous season
The Bulldogs finished the 2019 season 6–6, 4–4 in SoCon play to finish in a three-way tie for fourth place.

Schedule
The Citadel had games scheduled against Elon and Charleston Southern, which were canceled due to the COVID-19 pandemic.

Game summaries

at South Florida

at Clemson

Eastern Kentucky

at Army

References

Citadel
The Citadel Bulldogs football seasons
Citadel Bulldogs football